Poljšica pri Gorjah is a settlement in the Municipality of Gorje in the Upper Carniola region of Slovenia.

Name
The name of the settlement was changed from Poljšica to Poljšica pri Gorjah in 1953.

References

External links
Poljšica pri Gorjah on Geopedia

Populated places in the Municipality of Gorje